National Highway 152A, commonly referred to as NH 152A is a national highway in  India. It is a spur road of National Highway 52.  NH-152A traverses the states of Punjab and Haryana in India.

Route 
NH 152A connects Khanauri, Shergarh, Amo in Punjab, Sangatpura, Nand, Sighwala, Sanghan, Mahal Kheri, Padala, Gandhi and Kaithal in Haryana.

Junctions  
 
  Terminal near Khanauri.
  Terminal near Kaithal.

See also 
 List of National Highways in India
 List of National Highways in India by state

References

External links 

 NH 152A on OpenStreetMap

National highways in India
National Highways in Punjab, India
National Highways in Haryana